Jeremy Martin (born ) is a Canadian male mountainbiker and cyclo-cross cyclist. He represented his nation on the mountainbike in the men's cross country event at the 2010 UCI Mountain Bike & Trials World Championships and in cyclo-croos in the men's elite event at the 2016 UCI Cyclo-cross World Championships  in Heusden-Zolder.

References

External links
 Profile at cyclingarchives.com

1992 births
Living people
Cyclo-cross cyclists
Canadian male cyclists
Place of birth missing (living people)
Canadian mountain bikers
21st-century Canadian people